Nação Nordestina is the fifteenth studio album and first double album by Brazilian solo artist Zé Ramalho. It was released in 2000. The cover art of the album is clearly based on The Beatles' Sgt. Pepper's Lonely Hearts Club Band. It is a concept album which tells the history of a traveller exploring the Northeastern Brazil.

Track listing

Personnel 
 Zé Ramalho – Arrangement on tracks 1, 2, 4, 5, 6, 7, 8, 9, 10, 14, 15, 16, 17, 20 viola on tracks 1, 2, 4, 5, 6, 7, 8, 9, 10, 11, 12, 13, 14, 15, 16, 17, 20 lead vocals on all tracks except for 11, acoustic guitar on track 3, ponteios on track 11
 Elba Ramalho – Lead vocals on track 13
 Ivete Sangalo – Lead vocals on track 15
 Fagner – Lead vocals on track 16
 Flávio José – Lead vocals on track 17
 Cascabulho – Lead vocals on track 18
 Silvério Pessoa – Lead vocals on track 18
 Naná Vasconcelos – Lead vocals on track 1, calabash on track 11, percussion on track 12
 Rick Ferreira  – Electric guitar on track 8
 Pepeu Gomes – electric guitar on track 16
 Chico Guedes  – Bass guitar on tracks 4, 8, 17
 Artur Maia – Bass guitar on tracks 6, 9, 10, 15
 Jamil Joanes – Bass guitar on track 16, 20
 Cláudio Ribeiro – Bass guitar on track 18
 Mingo Araújo – Percussion on track 4, 16
 João Firmino – Percussion on track 5, 6, 7, 8, 10, 13, triangle on track 11
 Zé Gomes – Percussion on tracks 9, 14, 15, 17, 20 pandeiro on track 11
 Zé Leal – Percussion on tracks 9, 14, 15, 17, 20
 Duane – Percussion on tracks 9, 14, 15, 17, 20 zabumba on track 11
 Kleber Magrão – Triangle on track 18
 Marcos Lopes – Agogô on track 18
 Wilson Farias – Pandeiro and ilú on track 18
 Jorge Martins – Zabumba and ilú on track 18
 César Micheles – Flute on tracks 9, 13, saxophone on track 13, fifes on track 17
 Zé da Flauta – Flute on track 18
 Marcos Moleta – Rebec on track 10
 Hermeto Pascoal – Melodica on track 11
 Lito Viana – Cavaquinho on track 18
 Dominguinhos – Accordion on tracks 4, 8, 14
 Waldonys – Accordion on tracks 5, 7, 12, 15, 16, 20
 Silveirinha – Accordion on track 18, choir on track 10
 Luiz Antônio – Arrangement on tracks 1, 8, 19 keyboard on tracks 1, 6, 19, bass guitar on tracks 12, 14
 Dodô de Moraes – Arrangement on track 1
 Robertinho de Recife – Arrangement on tracks 3, 12, 13, 16, sampler on track 3, electric guitar on tracks 4, 5, 6, 8, 20 vocalise on track 7, charango on track 7, sitar on track 13, on berimbau on track 10, cavaquinho on track 14
 Armandinho – Baiana electric guitar on track 15
 Léo Ortiz – Violin on track 13
 Glauco Fernandes – Violin on track 13
 Luiz Fernando Zamith – Cello on track 13
 Nayran Pessanha – Viola on track 13
 Dênis Ferreira – Choir on track 10
 Eduardo Krieger – Choir on track 10
 Fábio Luna – Choir on track 10
 Fabrício Signorelli – Choir on track 10
 Lucas Amorim – Choir on track 10
 Roberta de Recife – Choir on track 10
 Adriana B.B. – Choir on track 10

References 

2000 albums
Zé Ramalho albums
Concept albums